The Ministry of Public Works, formerly Ministry of Works & Urban Development and Ministry of Public Works and Transport, is a government agency of the Commonwealth of the Bahamas. Its head office is in Nassau.

As of May 2017, The Hon. Desmond Bannister, MP serves as the Minister, Iram Lewis, M.P. serves as Parliamentary Secretary, and Antonette Thompson serves as the Permanent Secretary.

References

External links

 Ministry of Public Works

Works and Urban Development
Bahamas
Bahamas
Transport organisations based in the Bahamas